Alone in the World (French: Seuls au monde) is a 1952 French comedy drama film directed by René Chanas and starring Madeleine Robinson, René Lefèvre and Louis Seigner. The film's sets were designed by the art director René Moulaert.

Synopsis
After receiving funds from a wealthy benefactor, François Hermenault establishes a home for underprivileged children. His work is assisted by a dedicated young woman Geneviève.

Cast
 Madeleine Robinson as Geneviève  
 René Lefèvre as François Hermenault  
 Louis Seigner as Le directeur  
 Raymond Cordy as Jules  
 Raphaël Patorni as L'avocat  
 Marcel Pérès as Morin 
 Georgette Anys as Mme Dussaut  
 Raymond Rognoni as Lassègue  
 Georges Tourreil as Le président du tribunal  
 Marcel Josz as Maître Borde  
 Jean Ozenne as Campbell  
 Marcel Delaître as Maillard 
 Marie Albe 
 Florence Brière
 André Chanu 
 Gilbert Dourlen 
 Serge Lecointe 
 Robert Lussac 
 Georges Paulais 
 Solange Sicard as La sage-femme  
 Nicolas Vogel

References

Bibliography 
 Parish, Robert. Film Actors Guide. Scarecrow Press, 1977.

External links 
 

1952 comedy-drama films
French comedy-drama films
1952 films
1950s French-language films
Films directed by René Chanas
French black-and-white films
1950s French films